José Adelino Ornelas Ferreira is a Venezuelan military officer and head of the operational command of the National Bolivarian Armed Forces of Venezuela. A longtime supporter of Venezuelan President Nicholas Maduro, Ferreira was targeted with sanctions by the Canadian government in April 2019.

During the 2019 Venezuela uprising, Ferreira's Twitter account denied his involvement with forces loyal to Juan Guaidó and reaffirmed his support for the Maduro presidency.

References 

Venezuelan military personnel
Year of birth missing (living people)
Living people